Mightier is an American company which produces a bio-responsive video game platform, also called Mightier, that helps children learn to manage their emotions.

History
Mightier was developed and tested at Boston Children's Hospital and Harvard Medical School to give kids a safe place to practice emotional regulation, develop coping skills, and build the emotional muscle memory they need to respond to life's challenges. 

It began as a research program at Boston Children's Hospital in 2009 and became the independent entity, Neuromotion Labs in 2014. The Mighteor product was released in 2017, and renamed Mightier in 2018. The program is highly regarded by parents for children with autism, ADHD, ADD, ODD, anxiety, and other emotional regulation challenges.  

The company works with popular video game developers to add the Mightier emotional learning layer to the games to keep kids engaged and learning. To date, more than 2.5 million games have been played with Mightier.

Funding
The company has raised $30 million in venture financing and closed a series B in 2021 with participation from Sony Innovation Fund, DigiTX and PBJ Capital.

Services
Mightier offers a library of biofeedback mobile video games and shared family activities to help kids 6-12 build the skill of emotional regulation.

Games 

 Air Hockey
 Brick Breaker
 Crossy Ninja
 Flying Ace
 Gelato Flicker
 Hibachi Hero
 Hundreds
 Kitty in the Box
 Mama Hawk
 Mini Metro
 Peko Peko Sushi
 Race the Sun
 Return of Invaders
 Robo Runner
 Rocat Jumpurr
 Rooms of Doom
 Runaway Toad
 Space Invasion
 Spiral Bound
 Super Best Ghost Game
 Tiki Taka Soccer
 Train Conductor World 
 Tumblestone
 Unpossible
 Whip Swing
 You Must Build a Boat 
 Zombie Fall

Awards and recognition
 2010 - Milton Foundation
 2012 - Deborah Monroe Foundation
 2014 - Boston Children’s Hospital IDHA Grant
 2016 - MassChallenge Finalist
2018 - Eco-Excellence Awards: Best App
2022 - National Parenting Product Award

See also
 Video game development
 Video game
 History of video games
 Outline of video games

References

Video game companies of the United States
Video game development software
Video games developed in the United States